Ondrupattal Undu Vazhvu is a 1960 Indian Tamil-language film directed by T. R. Ramanna. The film stars M. R. Radha, E. V. Saroja, Prem Nazir and R. Muthuraman. It was released on 15 July 1960.

Plot

The moral of the story is that people cannot live without inter-dependence.

Cast and Crew
The details are compiled from the database of Film News Anandan and film credits.

Cast

M. R. Radha
Prem Nazir
R. Muthuraman
Kaka Radhakrishnan
E. V. Saroja
Malini
M. Saroja
 P. D. Sambandam
A. Veerappan
Sayeeram
Peer Mohamed
Kolathu Mani
Karuppiah
Natarajan
Sami

Dance
Sukumari
Reddi

Crew

Producers: Kanagaraj, Ramakrishnan
Director: T. R. Ramanna
Story: Vinothkumar
Dialogues: Thuraiyur K. Moorthi
Cinematography: T. K. Rajabadhar
Editing: M. V. Rajan
Art: Gnanayudham
Choreography: P. S. Gopalakrishnan, Thangaraj, Rajkumar, Ramasamy
Photography: R. N. Nagaraja Rao
Laboratory: Vijaya
Studio: Vijaya Vauhini Studios

Soundtrack
Music was composed by the duo Viswanathan–Ramamoorthy and the lyrics were penned by Pattukkottai Kalyanasundaram. Playback singers are T. M. Soundararajan, S. C. Krishnan, Sirkazhi Govindarajan, A. L. Raghavan, Jikki, K. Jamuna Rani, P. Susheela and L. R. Eswari.

Reception 
The Indian Express wrote, "Ondru Pattal Undu Vazhvoo is yet another Tamil production trying to cash in on the current box office trend of sublimating the workers' cause."

References

External links

1960 drama films
1960s Tamil-language films
Films directed by T. R. Ramanna
Films scored by Viswanathan–Ramamoorthy
Indian drama films